Bud in Paris is an album by jazz pianist Bud Powell, originally released on Xanadu Records in 1975, containing non-studio recordings made of Powell in Paris between December 1959 and October 1960.  It is not to be confused with the 1964 Reprise recording, Bud Powell in Paris.

The first session on the disc (tracks 1-2), from 14 February 1960, is a duet between Powell and Johnny Griffin on tenor. The next session (tracks 3-6), from 12 December 1959, features Barney Wilen on tenor with Powell, Pierre Michelot (bass), and Kenny Clarke (drums). The exact locations in Paris for these dates are unknown.

The last seven tracks (7-13) with Powell, Michelot and Clarke, are from three separate dates in 1960: tracks 7-10 from 14 October, track 11 from 12 March, and tracks 12-13 from 15 June. The October date was recorded at the Théâtre des Champs-Élysées, and the two last dates were recorded at the Blue Note Café. The June tracks also appear on Earl Bud Powell, Vol. 5: Groovin' at the Blue Note, 59-61 (Mythic Sound).

Track listing 
Except where otherwise noted, all songs composed by Bud Powell.
 "Idaho" (Jesse Stone) – 6:58
 "Perdido" (Juan Tizol, Ervin Drake, H. J. Lengsfelder) – 5:26
 "Shaw 'Nuff" (Ray Brown, Gil Fuller, Dizzy Gillespie) – 2:46
 "Oleo" (Sonny Rollins) – 2:11
 "Autumn in New York" (Vernon Duke) – 4:10
 "John's Abbey" – 2:39
 "John's Abbey" – 4:08
 "Buttercup" – 5:20
 "Sweet and Lovely" (Gus Arnheim, Jules LeMare, Harry Tobias) – 3:23
 "Crossin' the Channel" – 4:15
 "Confirmation" (Charlie Parker) – 2:25
 "Get Happy" (Harold Arlen, Ted Koehler) – 2:38
 "John's Abbey" – 2:15

Personnel

Performance 
 Bud Powell – piano
 Johnny Griffin – tenor sax (tracks 1-2 only)
 Barney Wilen – tenor sax (tracks 3-6 only)
 Pierre Michelot – bass (except tracks 1-2)
 Kenny Clarke – drums (except tracks 1-2)

Production 
 Don Schlitten – producer, photography
 Mark Gardner – liner notes
 Paul Goodman – remastering

References 
Notes

Sources
 Xanadu Records 102
 Bud in Paris at [ Allmusic.com]

Bud Powell albums
1960 live albums
Xanadu Records live albums
Albums produced by Don Schlitten